In enzymology, a S-(hydroxymethyl)glutathione dehydrogenase is an enzyme that catalyzes the chemical reaction

S-(hydroxymethyl)glutathione + NAD(P)+  S-formylglutathione + NAD(P)H + H+

The 3 substrates of this enzyme are S-(hydroxymethyl)glutathione, NAD+, and NADP+, whereas its 4 products are S-formylglutathione, NADH, NADPH, and H+.

This enzyme belongs to the family of oxidoreductases, specifically those acting on the CH-OH group of donor with NAD+ or NADP+ as acceptor. The systematic name of this enzyme class is S-(hydroxymethyl)glutathione:NAD+ oxidoreductase. Other names in common use include NAD-linked formaldehyde dehydrogenase (incorrect), formaldehyde dehydrogenase (incorrect), formic dehydrogenase (incorrect), class III alcohol dehydrogenase, ADH3, &chi, -ADH, FDH (incorrect), formaldehyde dehydrogenase (glutathione) (incorrect), GS-FDH (incorrect), glutathione-dependent formaldehyde dehydrogenase (incorrect), NAD-dependent formaldehyde dehydrogenase, GD-FALDH, and NAD- and glutathione-dependent formaldehyde dehydrogenase. This enzyme participates in methane metabolism.

Structural studies

References

 
 
 
 
 
 
 

EC 1.1.1
NADPH-dependent enzymes
NADH-dependent enzymes
Enzymes of known structure